Nine Choucroun, born Fortunée Schecroun (October 6, 1896 – December 10, 1978) was a French biochemist. She was director of research at the Institut de biologie physico-chimique in Paris. She developed, inter alia, the electrophoresis.

Collaborator of Jean Perrin, she became his partner after the death of his wife Henriette in 1938. She managed to board the ocean liner  Massilia that allowed them to escape with part of the French government in June 1940 to Casablanca, boarding later the SS Excambion in December 1941, arriving in New York City on December 23, 1941.

Nine Choucroun Prize
Nine Choucroun wanted to encourage young researchers to research in the area, very wide, from the physico-chemical biology. The Nine Choucroun Prize, annual, was created in December 1980 by her heirs. The value of the prize until 2008 was €5,000 and has been raised to €8,000 in 2011. This prize, awarded under the auspices of the physico-chemical Biology Institute and the Edmond de Rothschild Foundation, is aimed at young researchers working in the field of physico-chemical biology.

External links
Prix Nine Choucroun

References
 Micheline Charpentier-Morize, Perrin, savant et homme politique, Paris, Belin, 1997 

Pieds-Noirs
French biochemists
Women biochemists
20th-century American women scientists
1896 births
1978 deaths
Migrants from French Algeria to France
French emigrants to the United States
American biochemists
20th-century French women scientists
People from Oran